Eduard Karl Joseph Michael Marcus Koloman Volkhold Maria Habsburg-Lothringen (born 12 January 1967), also known by his traditional title of Archduke Eduard of Austria, is a Hungarian diplomat and is Hungary's current ambassador to the Holy See. He is also a member of the House of Habsburg-Lorraine, the former ruling family of Austria-Hungary

Early life 
Habsburg is the son of Archduke Michael of Austria (b. 1942), son of Archduke Joseph Francis of Austria, and Princess Anna of Saxony, and Princess Christiana of Löwenstein-Wertheim-Rosenberg (1940), daughter of Karl, 8th Prince of Löwenstein-Wertheim-Rosenberg. He acquired Hungarian citizenship as his father was born in Hungary. Eduard is the great-great-great-grandson of Emperor Franz Joseph I.

Diplomatic career 
Since 2015, he has served as Hungary’s ambassador to the Holy See and Sovereign Military Order of Malta.

Personal life 
On 1 July 1995 he married Baroness Maria Theresia von Gudenus (b. 1967), daughter of Gordian, Baron von Gudenus (1915-2003) and his wife, Countess Anna Maria Ladislaja Caroline von Meran (1922-1999), a descendant of Archduke Johann of Austria. They have six children, one son and five daughters. 

Habsburg is a practicing Catholic. He has expressed an admiration for Thomas More, Pope Gregory I, József Mindszenty, Thérèse of Lisieux, Blessed Karl of Austria (Emperor Charles I), and Edward the Confessor.

Ancestry

Publications

Articles

Books
 . 2008.
 . 2008.
 . 2011.
 Marcus Schwier: Intérieurs. 2012.
 Lena in Waldersbach. 2013.
 Dubbie: The Double-Headed Eagle. Full Quiver Publishing, 2020.
 ''The Habsburg Way. 7 Rules for Turbulent Times. Sophia Inst Pr, 2023

References

External links

 
 

1967 births
Living people
Eduard of Austria, Archduke
Ambassadors of Hungary to the Holy See
Austrian Roman Catholics
Hungarian Roman Catholics
Knights of the Golden Fleece of Austria